The Catonsville Times is a weekly community newspaper for Catonsville, Maryland, USA. The Times is owned by Patuxent Publishing, a subsidiary of the Times Mirror Newspaper Group. The offices are located on Frederick Road.

In 1997 the Baltimore Sun Group bought Patuxent Publishing's the Catonsville Times and other local newspapers around the Baltimore area and later began selling off associated property assets.

Sources

References 

Catonsville, Maryland
Newspapers published in Maryland
Tribune Publishing
Publications with year of establishment missing